City Road runs through the Plasnewydd area of Cardiff, Wales. It  is mostly lined with small shops and business premises. City Road had its own television series, broadcast on BBC Wales.

History

City Road was originally known as Plwcca Lane. Plwcca meaning dirty, wet, uncultivated land. Alai meaning an alley. In 1830 Plwcca Lane consisted of Roath Castle and six small cottages in two fields, it led to Plwcca Halog, named after the Gallows Field, which was where public executions were carried out.

Plwcca Lane became Castle Road in 1874, which was named after Roath Castle. it ran north south from Cardiff through the settlement of Plasnewydd. Roath and Plasnewydd were absorbed into Cardiff in 1875. Castle Road was renamed City Road in 1905 to mark Cardiff's new city status, after the Parish of Roath was absorbed into the county borough of Cardiff in 1903, as Cardiff already had another Castle Street. City Road gained the B4261 number classification in the late 1920s.

The northern point, where five roads (City Road, Richmond Road, Crwys Road, Mackintosh Place, Albany Road) meet, has in later years gained the name "Death Junction", possibly because of its difficulty for pedestrians and motorists, although an alternative explanation is that it was the location of a gallows where criminals were executed. It was the site of the execution of Philip Evans and John Lloyd, two Roman Catholic priests who were hung, drawn and quartered here in 1679. Philip Evans and John Lloyd were canonised by Pope Paul VI in 1970.

Description
The road has hosted a number of public houses, a cinema and a college campus.

City Road has gained a reputation for its multicultural mixture of restaurants and food takeaways.

TV series
City Road was the subject of a three-part television series, first broadcast on BBC One Wales in July 2016. The series featured several businesses including a hairdressers, a sex shop and a fitness centre. The series was made in partnership with Made Television and also broadcast on Made in Cardiff.

Notable residents
 John Sankey, 1st Viscount Sankey (1866–1948), lawyer, politician and Lord Chancellor, lived here as a child

References

External links

Roads in Cardiff
Roath